The Royal Commission into Victoria's Mental Health System, more widely known as the Mental Health Royal Commission, is a royal commission in Victoria, Australia. It was established on 22 February 2019 to investigate deficiencies in the state's mental health system and the broader prevalence of mental illnesses and suicides in the state. The commission published and delivered its interim report to the Governor on 27 November 2019 and tabled in Parliament on the same day. The Commission delivered its final report on 3 February 2021 and it was tabled on 2 March 2021, prior to an historic joint sitting of the Victorian Parliament held on this date at the Royal Exhibition Building in Melbourne.

Recommendations 

The Royal Commission’s final report includes 65 recommendations in addition to the nine interim report recommendations.

The recommendations set out a 10-year vision for a future mental health system in Victoria where people can access treatment close to their homes and in their communities. Importantly, people with lived experience of mental illness or psychological distress will be central to the design and delivery of this new mental health and wellbeing system being implemented as a result of this Royal Commission.

The Royal Commission's recommendations are grouped around four key features of the future mental health and wellbeing system:

1) A responsive and integrated system with community at its heart

2) A system attuned to promoting inclusion and addressing inequities

3) Re-established public confidence through prioritisation and collaboration

4) Contemporary and adaptable services.  

The Government of Victoria has committed to implementing all recommendations, establishing Mental Health Reform Victoria for this purpose. In July 2021, its staff and functions moved to the new Mental Health and Wellbeing Division within the Department of Health (Victoria).

The 2021-22 Victorian State Budget responded to the recommendations of the Royal Commission into Victoria’s Mental Health System, with the Victorian Government announcing a record $3.8 billion investment in mental health and wellbeing.

A new Mental Health and Wellbeing Act for Victoria 

As part of its recommendations, the Royal Commission recommended the repeal of the current Mental Health Act 2014 and enactment of a new Mental Health and Wellbeing Act for the state of Victoria.

This new Act will:

 promote good mental health and wellbeing for all people in Victoria

 reset the legislative foundations for the mental health and wellbeing system

 support the delivery of services that are responsive to the needs and preferences of Victorians

 put the views, preferences and values of people living with mental illness or psychological distress, families, carers and supporters at the forefront of service design and delivery.

The Royal Commission has recommended that the new Mental Health and Wellbeing Act be passed no later than mid-2022.

The Department of Health ran public engagement to help with the drafting of the Mental Health and Wellbeing Bill from June to August 2021. The department will work with consumers, families, carers, supporters, workers and providers to develop guidelines, regulations and processes to support the new Act once it has been passed by the Victorian Parliament.

References and further reading 

 
 
  (more reference material at bottom of article)
  (refers to consultation process prior to royal commission being established)

External Links 

 The Royal Commission into Victoria's Mental Health System

Victoria (Australia) royal commissions